Panagiotis Michanidis (Greek: Παναγιώτης Μηχανίδης) was a leader and fighter of the Greek Revolution of 1821 from Maroneia, Thrace.

Biography 
Panagiotis Michanidis was from Maroneia. 

Before the revolution, he was a member of the Filiki Etaireia, and had the rank of Apostle. He vigorously spread the idea of the Revolution and publicised the events in Kalamata. 

As a military man, he followed Mavromichalis. When he left Kalamata, Michanidis continued his work of transmitting the news. This, along with his way of writing it, acted as a morale boost for the revolutionaries.

Sources

References 

Greek people of the Greek War of Independence
People from Maroneia